KCAB (980 kHz) is an AM radio station licensed to Dardanelle, Arkansas, United States. The station is currently owned by Bobby Caldwell's East Arkansas Broadcasters, through licensee EAB of Russellville, LLC.

Formerly owned by Max Media, KCAB and five other stations were sold to current owners East Arkansas Broadcasters for $3 million; the transaction was consummated on January 9, 2014.  The station simulcasts on a translator, FM 97.1.

Programming
KCAB's former weekday local programming included the "Swap Shop" program from 9:00 to 10:00 a.m (also airs on Saturdays); and "Spotlight on the River Valley," a local talk show hosted by Johnny Story. Syndicated programming included "Good Day" with Doug Stephan, The Rush Limbaugh Show and Sean Hannity. The station also aired Arkansas Tech University sports.

References

External links

CAB (AM)
Adult hits radio stations in the United States
Radio stations established in 1985
1985 establishments in Arkansas
Dardanelle, Arkansas